

ranger is a free and open-source file manager with text-based user interface for Unix-like systems. It is developed by Roman Zimbelmann and licensed under the terms of the GNU General Public License. The program can accomplish file management tasks with a few keystrokes, and mouse input is optional. In conjunction with extensions including the rifle file opener and scope.sh, ranger can be scripted to open files with pre-defined programs, and to display a preview of the selected file by calling external programs.

Features 
 UTF-8 support
 Multi-column display (Miller columns)
 Preview of the selected file/directory
 Common file operations (create/chmod/copy/delete/...)
 VI-like console and hotkeys
 Renaming multiple files at once
 Automatically determine file types and run them with correct programs
 Change the directory of your shell after exiting ranger
 Tabs, bookmarks, mouse support
 True-color image previews
 Video thumbnails

Design 
ranger is written in Python and the text-based interface uses ncurses. The program makes use of the Miller columns visualization technique to display folder structures in three columns, whose default width ratios are 1:3:4. The currently active folder is always displayed in the central column, while folders higher up in the hierarchy are on the left. The rightmost column is used for displaying deeper folders and file previews.

Configuration 
ranger borrows its keybindings from vi where possible, but also accepts mouse buttons and shares a few keybindings with GNU Readline and Midnight Commander.

Comparison with other file managers 
Due to its use of the Miller columns layout, ranger has been compared to Finder, the default file manager used on the classic Mac OS and macOS operating systems. In addition, most core utilities related to file management (cd, ls, rm, mv, ln, touch, etc.) are available from within ranger's distinct command language layer.
File browser with a similar text user interface include rover and nnn.

Reception 
A 2012 survey among Arch Linux users found that ranger was the most used text-based file manager among respondents, surpassing Midnight Commander, the second most widely used text-based file manager, by a factor of two and a half (20% to 8%). ranger also received 0.9% of votes in the "Best File Manager" category in a 2013 survey by Linux Journal. LinuxLinks named it one of the "10 Best Orthodox Free Linux File Managers", and one of its "5 Top Console Linux File Managers". It is often cited in magazine articles and software blogs for power users as an illustration of the power and versatility of the command line interface.

See also 

 Midnight Commander
 List of file managers
 Comparison of file managers

References

External links 

Documentation

Free software programmed in Python
Free file managers
Software that uses ncurses
Console applications
Linux software